Olearia tomentosa, commonly known as the toothed daisy-bush, is a species of flowering plant in the family Asteraceae and is endemic to south-eastern continental Australia. It is a spreading shrub with egg-shaped leaves, the edges toothed or lobed, and blue or white and yellow, daisy-like inflorescences.

Description
The edges of the leaves are toothed of lobed, the lower surface densely hairy.

Taxonomy
This daisy was described in 1798 by German botanist Johann Christoph Wendland who gave it the name Aster tomentosus. In 1836, Augustin Pyramus de Candolle changed the name to Olearia tomentosa. The specific epithet (tomentosa) means "covered with matted hairs", referring to the underside of the leaves. 
It is the type species of the genus, and was placed in the section Dicerotriche, yet genetically is sister to the section Asterotriche.

Distribution and habitat
Toothed daisy-bush is found south of the Hastings River and inland as far as the Blue Mountains in eastern New South Wales, and east of Mallacoota Inlet in the far east of Victoria. It grows on sandstone-based soils in dry sclerophyll forest and heath.

Ecology
Olearia tomentosa plants are generally killed by bushfire, though there are reports of plants regrowing from suckers after fire.

Use in horticulture
Not commonly seen in cultivation, O. tomentosa grows in soil with good drainage in a sunny or part-shaded location. Regular pruning prevents the plant from becoming leggy, and can rejuvenate older plants. The species is moderately frost-hardy.

References

tomentosa
Asterales of Australia
Flora of New South Wales
Flora of Victoria (Australia)
Plants described in 1798
Taxa named by Johann Christoph Wendland